This is a list of places of interest in Cheshire, England. See List of places in Cheshire for a list of settlements in the county.

Places of interest

Country parks, gardens and accessible open spaces

Bickerton Hill 
Daresbury Firs 
Delamere Forest 
The Edge, Alderley Edge 
Hare Hill 
Helsby Hill, Helsby 
Lamaload Reservoir 
Macclesfield Forest 
Mersey Forest 
Murdishaw Valley, Runcorn 
Ness Botanic Gardens
Northwich Community Woodlands 
Pick Mere, Pickmere 
Peckforton Hills 
Pickerings Pasture, Widnes 
Runcorn Hill 
Shakerley Mere 
Shining Tor 
Shutlingsloe 
Swettenham Meadows Nature Reserve 
Tatton Park 
Tegg's Nose Country Park 
Wigg Island, Runcorn 
Windgather Rocks 
Winsford Flashes

Castles and houses

Adlington Hall 
Arley Hall 
Beeston Castle  
Bolesworth Castle 
Capesthorne Hall 
Cholmondeley Castle 
Doddington Park
Dorfold Hall 
Eaton Hall 
Elton Hall, Aldford
Gawsworth Hall 
Halton Castle 
Holt Castle 
Little Moreton Hall 
Lyme Park 
Moss Hall, Audlem 
Norton Priory  
Peckforton Castle 
Peover Hall
Tabley House 
Vale Royal Abbey

Footpaths

Biddulph Valley Way
Gritstone Trail
Sandstone Trail
South Cheshire Way
Wirral Way (partly in Cheshire)

Museums

Cuckooland Museum, Tabley (Knutsford) 
National Waterways Museum, Ellesmere Port 
Catalyst Science Discovery Centre, Widnes 
Grosvenor Museum, Chester 
Hack Green Secret Nuclear Bunker 
Lion Salt Works, Marston 
Weaver Hall Museum and Workhouse, Northwich

Other places of interest

The Bridestones
Chester Cathedral 
Chester city walls
Chester Grosvenor and Spa 
Chester Zoo 
Jodrell Bank Observatory
Parkgate
Sandbach Crosses

Watermills

Bunbury Mill
Nether Alderley Mill 
Quarry Bank Mill 
Stretton Watermill

Waterways

Anderton Boat Lift
Ashton Canal
Bridgewater Canal
Macclesfield Canal
River Bollin
River Dane
River Dee
River Gowy
River Goyt
River Mersey
Peak Forest Canal
Rochdale Canal
Shropshire Union Canal
Trent and Mersey Canal
Wardle Canal
River Weaver

See also

List of places in Cheshire

 
Cheshire